is a railway station on the Chikuho Main Line operated by JR Kyushu in Mizumaki, Onga District, Fukuoka Prefecture, Japan.

Lines

Station layout 
The station is located on a piece of land where the two tracks of the Chikuhō Main Line diverge. The station building, a modern timber structure, is in between the tracks and houses a waiting room and automatic ticket vending machines. Steps or ramps lead up to a triangular piece of land with platforms on two sides, the station building occupying the base of the triangle. The two platforms thus be considered a very broad island or two widely separate side platforms.

Adjacent stations

History 
The station was opened by JR Kyushu on 13 March 1988 as an additional station on the existing Chikuhō Main Line track.

On 4 March 2017, Higashi-Mizumaki, along with several other stations on the line, became a remotely managed "Smart Support Station".

Passenger statistics
In fiscal 2016, the station was used by an average of 450 passengers daily (boarding passengers only), and it ranked 256th among the busiest stations of JR Kyushu.

References

External links
Higashi-Mizumaki (JR Kyushu)

Railway stations in Fukuoka Prefecture
Railway stations in Japan opened in 1988